is a district of Nakano, Tokyo, Japan. 

As of October 2020, the population of this district is 29,587. The postal code for Honchō is 164-0012.

Geography
Honchō borders Chūō in the north, Nishi-Shinjuku to the east, Yayoichō to the south, and Wada to the west.

Education
Nakano City Board of Education (中野区教育委員会) operates public elementary and junior high schools.

Schools in Honcho:
 Nakano City Daini (No. 2) Junior High School (中野区立第二中学校)
 Nakano City Hongō Elementary School (中野区立中野本郷小学校)

Honcho 1-3 chome are zoned to Nakano No. 1 Elementary School (中野第一小学校). 4-6 chome are zoned to Hongō Elementary. All parts of Nakano are zoned to No. 2 Junior High.

References

Neighborhoods of Tokyo
Nakano, Tokyo